Stuart Morrison (born 18 April 1999) is a Scottish footballer who plays as a centre back for Queen of the South. Morrison has previously played for Dunfermline Athletic and Queen's Park, as well loan spells at Edinburgh and the Spiders. Morrison has also represented Scotland at U19's level.

Career
Morrison, who attended Inverkeithing High School, started his career with Dunfermline Athletic's youth academy from the age of eight years old. Morrison was then with Fife's Elite Football Academy before re-signing with the Pars in May 2016. Morrison was then sent out on loan to Scottish League Two club Edinburgh, where he spent the 2017-18 season, where he played 23 times for the Citizens.

For the majority of the 2018-19 season, Morrison was playing with the Pars reserve team, although he was also an unused substitute for a number of first-team matches. On 14 August 2018, Morrison debuted for the first-team in a Scottish Challenge Cup match versus Inverness Caledonian Thistle, his boyhood club that he supported, where he played the entire match in a 2–1 away win. Morrison had his league debut, also against the Caley Jags on the final day of the 2018–19 season. Morrison then signed a new one-year deal with the Pars in May 2019. In February 2020, Morrison signed on loan with Queen's Park until the end of the 2019-20 season. In June 2020, Morrison was released by the Pars at the end of his contract.

On 11 August 2020, Morrison signed a permanent deal with Queen's Park. 

On 31 May 2022, Morrison signed a one-year contract with Scottish League One club Queen of the South.

Career statistics

References

External links

1999 births
Living people
Scottish footballers
Association football defenders
Association football midfielders
Dunfermline Athletic F.C. players
Scottish Professional Football League players
F.C. Edinburgh players
Queen's Park F.C. players
Queen of the South F.C. players